Gillis Andersson (4 July 1912 – 13 July 1988) was a Swedish footballer who played as a midfielder. He made one appearance for the Sweden national team in 1938. He was also part of Sweden's squad for the football tournament at the 1936 Summer Olympics, but he did not play in any matches.

References

External links
 

1912 births
1988 deaths
Swedish footballers
Association football midfielders
Sweden international footballers
People from Borås
Sportspeople from Västra Götaland County